John Ewart Wallace Sterling (August 6, 1906 – July 1, 1985) was an American educator who served as President of Stanford University between 1949 and 1968.

Life and career
Sterling was born in Linwood, Ontario, the son of Annie (née Wallace) and William Sterling, a Methodist clergyman.  He pursued his undergraduate studies at the University of Toronto and received a Master of Arts degree from the University of Alberta.

He began his doctoral studies in history at Stanford University in 1932, serving on the research staff of the Hoover Institution.  Upon receiving a Ph.D. in 1938, he joined the faculty of the California Institute of Technology.  In 1948, he left Caltech to head the Huntington Library and Art Gallery and shortly afterward was offered the Stanford presidency.

Sterling was married to Anna Maria Shaver.

Stanford presidency
During his 20-year term as president he oversaw the growth of Stanford from a financially troubled regional university to a financially sound, internationally recognized academic powerhouse, "the Harvard of the West". Achievements during his tenure included:
 Moving the Stanford Medical School from a small, inadequate campus in San Francisco to a new facility on the Stanford campus which was fully integrated into the university to an unusual degree for medical schools.
 Establishing the Stanford Industrial Park (now the Stanford Research Park) and the Stanford Shopping Center on leased University land, thus stabilizing the university's finances. The Stanford Industrial Park, together with the university's aggressive pursuit of government research grants, helped to spur the development of Silicon Valley.
 Increasing the number of students receiving financial aid from less than 5% when he took office to more than one-third when he retired.
 Increasing the size of the student body from 8,300 to 11,300 and the size of the tenured faculty from 322 to 974.
 Launching the PACE fundraising program, the largest such program ever undertaken by any university up to that time.
 Launching a building boom on campus that included a new bookstore, post office, student union, dormitories, a faculty club, and many academic buildings.
 Creating the Overseas Campus program for undergraduates in 1958.
In 2022, Stanford University issued a public apology for its discrimination against Jewish applicants in the 1950s, which was documented through internal memos involving Sterling.

Memorials

 On March 2, 2015, Stanford Archives posted 444 images of Sterling and his papers to its Flickr stream.
 An Indian rubber tree (Ficus elastica cv. doescheri), which he planted at the opening of the University of Hawai‘i at Mānoa's Sinclair Library, is listed by the UHM Campus Arboretum as the J. E. Wallace Sterling Namesake Tree.

References

1906 births
1985 deaths
California Institute of Technology faculty
People from Lambton County
Presidents of Stanford University
Stanford University alumni
University of Toronto alumni
20th-century American historians
American male non-fiction writers
Commanders Crosses of the Order of Merit of the Federal Republic of Germany
20th-century American male writers
Canadian emigrants to the United States
20th-century American academics